Bottrall is a surname. Notable people with the surname include: 

Anthony Bottrall (1938–2014), British diplomat and politician
Ronald Bottrall (1906–1989), Cornish poet

See also
Bottrill